Garden Hotspurs Football Club is a Saint Kitts and Nevis football club from Basseterre.

They play in the Saint Kitts and Nevis Premier Division

History
Founded in 1962, Hotspurs have won the domestic championship 4 times.

Achievements
Saint Kitts and Nevis Premier Division: 4
 1986, 1990, 1994, 2000–01
Saint Kitts and Nevis National Cup: 1
 2015–16

External links
Club profile – SKNFA
Club Website

Football clubs in Saint Kitts and Nevis
Association football clubs established in 1962
1962 establishments in Saint Kitts and Nevis